Esse arts + opinions, published three times a year by Les éditions Esse, is a contemporary art magazine that focuses on disciplinary and interdisciplinary practices (visual arts, performance, video, current music and dance, experimental theatre) and all forms of socially inclined, site-specific or performative intervention. It favours analyses that address artworks within their (geographical, social, political or economical) contexts. It seeks to offer readers a topical magazine in the field of multidisciplinary art, as well as a communication, information and research tool that answers their needs. More than a magazine publisher, Esse plays an active role in the art world. From time to time, Les éditions Esse organizes art symposiums and publishes their proceedings in bilingual books that are internationally distributed.

History
Esse was founded in 1984 at UQAM (Université du Québec à Montréal), becoming a not-for-profit organization in 1987. Esse is distributed in Canada and the United States by Disticor Magazine Distribution Services, in France by Dif' Pop' & Pollen Diffusion, and in Europe and Asia by Export Press.

Esse arts + opinions is a contemporary art magazine that focuses on disciplinary and multidisciplinary practices (visual arts, performance, video, current music and dance, experimental theatre, etc.) and all forms of socially inclined, site-specific or performative intervention. It favours analyses that address artworks within their (geographical, social, political or economical) contexts, as well as relational and socially engaged works.

The magazine stands out for its commitment to creating links between art practice and analysis. It is recognized for the quality of its articles, offering both in-depth analyses and rigorously argued opinions on art and society.

Each issue contains a thematic section and articles on international cultural projects.

Esse magazine is published by Les éditions Esse.

Awards
Prix d’excellence de la SODEP, Awards for Magazine of the year, 2022.

National Magazine Awards, Art Direction Grand Prix by Studio FEED for issue #102 (Re)seeing Painting, 2022.

Prix d’excellence de la SODEP, Awards for Best issue for issue #99 Plants, 2021.

Prix d’excellence de la SODEP, Category "Conception graphique" (Graphic Design), "Page couverture" (Cover Page) by Studio FEED for issue #99 Plants, 2021.

The ICMA – International Creative Media Award, Worldwide Competition for Corporate Medias, Books, Corporate Design and Magazines, Germany. Silver : Print Magazines - Category Art, Architecture, Design and Music, 2020.

The ICMA – International Creative Media Award, Worldwide Competition for Corporate Medias, Books, Corporate Design and Magazines, Germany. Silver : Print Magazines - Art, Architecture, Design and Music, 2019.

National Magazine Awards, Best Magazine: Art, Literary, & Culture, 2019.

Prix d’excellence de la SODEP, Category "Conception graphique" (Graphic Design), "Page couverture" (Cover Page) by Studio FEED for issue #91 LGBT+, 2018.

Prix d’excellence de la SODEP, Category "Conception graphique" (Graphic Design), "Pages intérieures" (Interior pages) by Studio FEED for issue #91 LGBT+, 2018.

Prix d’excellence de la SODEP, Category "Critique" (Criticism), "Texte d’opinion critique" (Critical Essay) for Sylvette Babin's article titled "Retranscription of Foundational Texts in Simon Bertrand’s Work" in issue #89 Library, 2018.

National Magazine Awards, Best Magazine: Art, Literary, & Culture, 2017.

The ICMA – International Creative Media Award, Worldwide Competition for Corporate Medias, Books, Corporate Design and Magazines, Germany. Silver : Print Magazines - Catégorie Art, Architecture, Design and Music, 2017.

The ICMA – International Creative Media Award, Worldwide Competition for Corporate Medias, Books, Corporate Design and Magazines, Germany. Award of Excellence : Category Front Page, by Studio FEED for issue #91 LGBT+, 2017.

National Magazine Awards, Honourable Mention for the Cover Grand Prix, by Studio FEED for issue #91 LGBT+, 2017.

National Magazine Awards, Honourable Mention for the Art Direction Grand Prix, by Studio FEED for issue #91 LGBT+, 2017.

Prix d’excellence de la SODEP, Category "Conception graphique" (Graphic Design), "Page couverture" (Cover Page) by Studio FEED for issue #88 Landscape, 2017.

Prix d’excellence de la SODEP, Category "Conception graphique" (Graphic Design), "Pages intérieures" (Interior Pages) by Studio FEED for issue #87 The Living, 2018.

National Magazine Awards, Best Magazine, Category "Literary, art, and poetry", 2017.

Applied Arts Awards, « Complete Magazine Design – Series » for #87 The Living, #88 Landscape, # 89 Library, 2017.

National Magazine Awards, Silver price for the Art Direction of an Entire Issue Esse #87 The Living, 2016.

Applied Arts Awards,  « Complete Magazine Design – Series » for #85 Taking a Stance, #86 Geopolitics, 2016.

In 2005, Esse tied for first place for the Grafika Grand Prix with issue no. 52. In 2006 issue no. 57 received awards from Applied Arts Magazine and Coupe Magazine for its graphic design. Issue no. 58 received another Grafika award in 2007. In 2009, Esse's 25th anniversary issue (Trouble-fête/Killjoy) rethinking the meaning of celebration wins a Grafika award in the "Magazines" category. In 2010, Esse is among the finalists of the Conseil des Arts de Montréal's 2009 Grand Prix and in 2011, Esse wins the Grafika award once more, for the previous year's three issues, Sabotage, Bling Bling, and Miniature.

Publications by Les éditions Esse

Indexing
Esse is indexed in Academic OneFile, ARTbibliographies Modern, Arts & Humanities Full Text, Canadian Business & Current Affairs, Canadian Periodical Index Quarterly, Fine Arts and Music Collection, General OneFile, Repère, and available on Érudit Platform and Flipster – Digital Magazines by Ebsco Publishing.

Esse is a member of the Société de développement des périodiques culturels québécois (SODEP) and of Magazines Canada.

References

External links
 Official website

Visual arts magazines published in Canada
Contemporary art magazines
Magazines established in 1984
Magazines published in Montreal
Triannual magazines